Night Cap Peak is a 10,641-foot-elevation (3,243 meter) mountain summit located in Tuolumne County, California, United States.

Description
Night Cap Peak is set along the boundary of the Emigrant Wilderness on land managed by Stanislaus National Forest. The peak is part of the Sierra Nevada mountain range and is situated 2.6 miles northwest of Leavitt Peak, and three miles west-southwest of Sonora Pass. Precipitation runoff from this mountain drains into Kennedy and Deadman creeks which are tributaries of the Middle Fork Stanislaus River.

Etymology
The peak was named "Night Cap" in the 1890s by the USGS, presumably because of its resemblance to a nightcap. The landform's present toponym was officially adopted in 1979 by the U.S. Board on Geographic Names.

Climate
According to the Köppen climate classification system, Night Cap Peak is located in an alpine climate zone. Most weather fronts originate in the Pacific Ocean, and travel east toward the Sierra Nevada mountains. As fronts approach, they are forced upward by the peaks (orographic lift), causing moisture in the form of rain or snowfall to drop onto the range.

Gallery

See also
 
 Kennedy Peak
 Granite Dome

References

External links
 Weather forecast: Night Cap Peak

Mountains of Tuolumne County, California
North American 3000 m summits
Mountains of Northern California
Sierra Nevada (United States)
Stanislaus National Forest